Chackaneh (is a city in Sarvelayat District, in Nishapur County, Razavi Khorasan Province, Iran. At the 2006 census, its population was 1,363, in 421 families.

References 

Populated places in Nishapur County
Cities in Razavi Khorasan Province